Helena Stenbäck (born 1979), won the Miss Sweden pageant in 2003 and represented the country in Miss Universe but did not make the top 15 cut. She is from Piteå and was educated in Umeå where she completed a Master in Economics. Helena became a full favorite of jury after her discussion about war in Iraq.

References 

1979 births
Living people
Miss Universe 2003 contestants
People from Piteå
Swedish beauty pageant winners
Swedish female models